In sport, a cap is a player's appearance in a game at international level. The term dates from the practice in the United Kingdom of awarding a cap to every player in an international match of rugby football and association football. In the early days of football, the concept of each team wearing a set of matching shirts had not been universally adopted, so each side would distinguish itself from the other by wearing a specific sort of cap.

An early illustration of the first international football match between Scotland and England in 1872 shows the Scottish players wearing cowls, and the English wearing a variety of school caps. The practice was first approved on 10 May 1886 for association football after a proposal made by N. Lane Jackson , founder of the Corinthians:

The act of awarding a cap is now international and is applied to other sports. Although in some sports physical caps may not now always be given (whether at all or for each appearance) the term cap for an international or other appearance has been retained as an indicator of the number of occasions on which a sportsperson has represented a team in a particular sport. Thus, a "cap" is awarded for each game played and so a player who has played x games for the team is said to have been capped x times or have won x caps.

The practice of awarding a physical cap varies from sport to sport. It may be awarded before a player's debut or, particularly for national teams, a commemorative cap may be awarded after a player reaches the 100th cap.

Association football
Some men's association football teams still award physical caps.  Players are awarded one cap for every match they play – unless they play in a World Cup or European Championship finals tournament, then they are given a single cap for the competition, with the names of all their opponents stitched into the fabric of the cap itself.  For example, when David Beckham made his one-hundredth appearance for England, because a number of his appearances had been at World Cup and European Championship final tournaments for which he could only receive one cap, he received only his 85th physical cap. In Scotland, for many years the practice was to present caps only for appearances in the British Home Championship, meaning that several players never received one (including those in their 1958 FIFA World Cup squad); this anomaly was rectified retrospectively in the 2000s after pressure from players' families.

FIFA recognises certain international games as ones where a player can be awarded a cap – these games are regarded as International "A" games. These are matches in which both nations field their first Representative Team.

Records

The world record holder for the highest number of international caps as of 5 November 2010 is retired American player Kristine Lilly, who has 354 caps. In men's association football, the record belongs to Bader Al-Mutawa of Kuwait; he surpassed Ahmad Hassan with his 184th cap on 27 March 2012. The first footballer to win 100 international caps was Billy Wright of England's Wolverhampton Wanderers. Wright went on to appear 105 times for England, 90 of them he obtained whilst he was a captain.

Bold denotes players currently active in international football.

Men

Women

Cricket

As in association football, cricket still awards a physical cap. Caps are awarded both at international and domestic level, however the criteria for winning a cap differs between international and domestic cricket.

In international cricket, a player is awarded a cap for every appearance made. It is common for a player to be presented with their cap in a ceremony on the first morning of their maiden Test match, although a physical cap may not be presented for every occasion on which a player represents his country. International caps are numbered according to the number of players who have represented the country before. For example, cap number 50 is awarded to the fiftieth player to represent the country.

In some domestic cricket competitions, caps are also awarded. However, they are not awarded automatically for every appearance made, but instead at the discretion of the administrators of the club for whom the recipient plays, and are a one-off recognition that the recipient is now a regular, established player for the club. The most prevalent example of this system is in English county cricket, in which many First Class counties award a "county cap" to players.

As of April 2021, 70 players have won 100 or more caps in Test cricket.

Records

Players still active at Test level are in bold type.

Notes

Rugby union

In rugby union, 64 players have reached 100 international caps as of 27 Oct 2019. Players from England, Scotland, Wales and Ireland are eligible for selection to the British & Irish Lions touring squad. Lions matches are classed as full international tests, and caps are awarded. The Pacific Islanders team, composed of players from Fiji, Samoa, Tonga, Niue and Cook Islands have a similar arrangement, although no players involved have so far reached 100 caps (Fijian Nicky Little is closest with 71 caps).

Players still active at Test level are in bold type.

Rugby league
The International Rugby League honours players that have made 50 international appearances in their career with a special golden cap. The record for most caps is held by former Australian Kangaroos player and captain Darren Lockyer with 59 matches.

Players still active at Test level are in bold type.

Netball

Physical caps are not distributed by the International Netball Federation but the term is still widely used to signify appearances. Irene van Dyk has won the most international caps having represented two nations after her switch to the Silver Ferns, a move that was allowed as the INF rules only prohibited players from representing two nations in one calendar year. Mary Waya is the only other woman to have earned over 200 caps in her thirty-year career, with exact numbers being difficult to confirm.

Players still active at Test level are in bold type.

References

External links

 Men's Records and Facts—FIFA
 Players with 100+ Caps (men) RSSSF
 Picture of International Football Cap—National Museum of Scotland
 Gallery of International Caps and Honours Caps

Association football records and statistics
Association football terminology
Caps
Sports terminology